The London Academy of Excellence Tottenham is a sixth form of free school which was opened in September 2017 in the London borough of Haringey. The principal educational sponsor is The Highgate School, a leading independent school in North London. Eight other leading independent schools in London and The South East will act as a partner school and Tottenham Hotspur Football Club is the business sponsor.

Background 
The sixth form free school offers the fifteen A-Level subjects most valued by prestigious universities and employers. It is based on the successful model of the London Academy of Excellence in the London borough of Newham, which was voted the "Best State Sixth Form in the Country" in 2015 and saw half of all A-level grades at A/A* in their 2016 A-level results. The sixth form was named by Tatler in its list of the "Best Secondary Schools 2017", praising its "super" academic facilities and "eagle-eyed" tutoring system. As of January 2017, 20 students held offers to study at Oxford or Cambridge.

The sixth form has substantial links with the local community, with all students volunteering in partnership teaching activities involving local schools based at the sixth form. 50% of offers are guaranteed to be made to students studying in five schools in the east of Haringey: Duke's Aldridge Academy, Gladesmore Community School, Heartlands High School, Park View School and Woodside High School. In December 2016, it was recommended by the Haringey STEM commission that the London Academy of Excellence Tottenham should be a centre for STEM teaching excellence, acting as a hub "for improvement, support and professional development" throughout the borough.

Educational sponsor 
The principal educational sponsor is Highgate School, a leading independent school in North London. As part of its charitable activity, the school has funded the Chrysalis Partnership, a scheme supporting 26 state schools in six London boroughs, a number of which acts as feeder schools for the new sixth form. Highgate School has been, since 2010, a founding partner of the London Academy of Excellence in Stratford.

As the principal educational sponsor, Highgate School recruited and deployed the full-time equivalent of five members of the total teaching staff, as well as assisting with wider administrative, pastoral and management support.

Eight leading independent schools – Alleyn's School, Chigwell School, Haberdashers' Aske's Boys' School, Harrow School, John Lyon School, Mill Hill School, North London Collegiate School, and St Dunstan's College – share their expertise and teaching staff.

Business sponsor 
The business sponsor is Tottenham Hotspur Football Club, providing financial support as well as the school premises and facilities management. The sixth form is situated in Lilywhite House, owned and operated by the football club. The school complements the ongoing Northumberland Development Project to build a football stadium which will replace White Hart Lane.

References 

Education in the London Borough of Haringey
Educational institutions established in 2017
2017 establishments in England
Sixth form colleges in London
Free schools in London